Anatoly Dneprov (also spelled Anatoly Dnieprov, pseudonym; real name Anatoliy Petrovych Mitskevitch) was a Soviet physicist, cyberneticist and writer of Ukrainian ancestry. His science fiction stories were published in the Soviet Union, Eastern Europe and the United States from 1958 to 1970. He is known best for his stories Crabs on the Island, The Maxwell Equations and The Purple Mummy.

Career
Anatoly Dneprov was a physicist who worked at the Institute of World Economy and International Relations of the Academy of Sciences of the Soviet Union.

Significance
The Progress Publishers, Moscow wrote of him: 

Algis Budrys compared his short story The Purple Mummy to that of Eando Binder. Although Dneprov is not well-known in countries outside the iron curtain, his predictions about artificial intelligence and self-replicating machines are uncanny.

The Game 

Dneprov's short story The Game (1961) presents a scenario, the Portuguese stadium, anticipating the later China brain and Chinese room thought experiments. It concerns a stadium of people who act as switches and memory cells implementing a program to translate a sentence of Portuguese, a language that none of them knows. The plot of the story goes as follows: All 1400 delegates of the Soviet Congress of Young Mathematicians willingly agree to take part in a "purely mathematical game" proposed by Professor Zarubin. The game requires the execution of a certain set of rules given to the participants, who communicate with each other using sentences composed only of the words "zero" and "one". After several hours of playing the game, the participants have no idea of what is going on as they get progressively tired. One girl becomes too dizzy and leaves the game just before it ends. On the next day, Professor Zarubin reveals to everyone's excitement that the participants were simulating an existing 1961 Soviet computing machine named "Ural" that translated a sentence written in Portuguese "Os maiores resultados são produzidos por – pequenos mas contínuos esforços," a language that nobody from the participants understood, into the sentence in Russian "The greatest goals are achieved through minor but continuous ekkedt", a language that everyone from the participants understood. It becomes clear that the last word, which should have been "efforts", is mistranslated due to the dizzy girl leaving the simulation.

The philosophical argument developed by Dneprov is presented in the form of Socratic dialogue. Consequently, the main conclusion from the Portuguese stadium is contained in the final words of the main character Professor Zarubin: "I think our game gave us the right answer to the question `Can machines think?' We have proven that even the most perfect simulation of machine thinking is not the thinking process itself."

The general structure of the proof constructed by Dneprov is the same as the one employed in the Chinese room argument:
 People are used to simulate the working of a computer machine, which translates a sentence from some unknown language A to their own language B.
 The people do not understand language A, neither before, nor after they perform the translation algorithm.
 Therefore, the mere execution of the translation algorithm does not provide understanding.

Polish science fiction writer Stanisław Lem summarizes Dneprov's argument in his book Summa Technologiae (1964) as follows:

Selected works
 Shipwreck (1958)
 Crabs on the Island (1958)

 The Maxwell Equations (1960)

 The World in Which I Disappeared (1961)
 The Game (1961)
 The Purple Mummy (1961)

 The Formula For Immortality (1962)
 When Questions Are Asked (1963)
 Prophets (1970)

See also

 Arkady and Boris Strugatsky
 Mir Publishers
 Molodaya Gvardiya
 Progress Publishers
 Soviet science fiction
 Stanisław Lem

References

20th-century Ukrainian physicists
Ukrainian male short story writers
Ukrainian short story writers
Soviet short story writers
20th-century short story writers
Writers from Dnipro
1919 births
1975 deaths
20th-century male writers